Events in the year 1989 in Cyprus.

Incumbents 

 President: Demetris Christofias
 President of the Parliament: Yiannakis Omirou

Events 
Ongoing – Cyprus dispute

 The University of Cyprus was established.
 Kormakitis FC, a Cypriot association football club based in Kormakitis, was founded.

Deaths

References 

 
1980s in Cyprus
Years of the 21st century in Cyprus
Cyprus
Cyprus
Cyprus